The 1952 United States Senate election in Nevada took place on November 4, 1952. Incumbent Republican U.S. Senator George W. Malone was re-elected to a second term in office.

Primary elections 
Primary elections were held on September 2, 1952.

Democratic primary

Candidate 
Alan Bible, attorney, former Attorney General of Nevada
Thomas B. Mechling, former Washington, D.C. newspaper writer

Results

Republican primary

Candidates 
Lawrence A. Ebert, gas station owner
George W. Malone, incumbent U.S. Senator

Results

General election

Results

References

Bibliography
 
 

Nevada
1952
United States Senate